Brenda Smith Myles, Ph. D. (born 1957) is an American author and researcher on the topic of the autism spectrum. As of 2021, she has written more than 300 articles and books on autism spectrum disorder. She was once found to be the world's second most productive applied researcher in ASD, by the University of Texas.

Early life and education 
Myles graduated with a Bachelor of Science (Elementary Education/Special Education) from the State University of New York at Old Westbury in 1985. The following year, she earned a Master of Science (Special Education, Learning Disabilities) from the University of Kansas. 1989 saw that university grant her a Ph. D in Special Education, Behavior Disorders and Learning Disabilities. While studying, she gained practical experience working with children at the University of Kansas Medical Center.

Career
After receiving her doctorate, she went joined the faculty of the Department of Special Education at her alma mater. While here, she undertook many research projects about young people with autism. She would eventually reach the rank of "Professor" here.

In 1997, she became the editor of the journal Intervention in School and Clinic, remaining so until 2005.

In 2002, she was awarded the Autism Society of America (ASA) Outstanding Literary Work of the Year, for her co-authored book Asperger Syndrome and Adolescence: Practical Solutions for School Success. The ASA went on to award Myles their Wendy F. Miller Autism Professional of the Year Award in 2004. She became a spokesperson and Chief Program Officer for the organisation.

The Council for Exceptional Children (CEC) gave her their Burton Blatt Humanitarian Award in 2004.

Myles became an American Occupational Therapy Association Scholar in 2007.

She received the Global and Regional Asperger Syndrome Partnership (GRASP) Divine Neurotypical Award in 2009.

A 2011 survey of autism support professionals by Canadian organisation, Autism Ontario, found that 34% had been influenced by Myles when devising their support programs.

In 2013, she became an American Academy of Pediatrics Autism Champion.

Myles won a National Parenting Publications Awards (NAPPA) Bronze Award in 2014 for her co-authored book Sensory Issues and High-Functioning Autism Spectrum and Related Disorders. That year the CEC awarded her the Burton Blatt award for a second time.

Young women with autism employment organisation "Yes She Can Inc" awarded Myles an "Advocates for Adults with Autism Award" in 2016.

She became the President of AAPC Publishing in 2017, and his since ceased to be so.

Myles was also for a time a Scientific Council Board Member for the Organization for Autism Research (OAR) in Washington, DC.

Selected works
 Asperger syndrome : a guide for educators and parents, 1998
 Asperger syndrome and difficult moments : practical solutions for tantrums, rage, and meltdowns, 1999
 Asperger syndrome and sensory issues : practical solutions for making sense of the world, 2000
 Asperger syndrome and adolescence : practical solutions for school success, 2001
 Simple strategies that work! : helpful hints for all educators of students with Asperger syndrome, high-functioning autism, and related disabilities, 2001
 The hidden curriculum : practical solutions for understanding unstated rules in social situations, 2004
 Children and youth with Asperger syndrome : strategies for success in inclusive settings, 2005

References

External links 
Personal website

1957 births
Living people
Autism researchers
State University of New York at Old Westbury alumni
University of Kansas alumni
American editors
21st-century American non-fiction writers
21st-century American women writers